182 (one hundred [and] eighty-two) is the natural number following 181 and preceding 183.

In mathematics
 182 is an even number
 182 is a composite number, as it is a positive integer with a positive divisor other than one or itself
 182 is a deficient number, as the sum of its proper divisors, 154,  is less than 182
 182 is a member of the Mian–Chowla sequence: 1, 2, 4, 8, 13, 21, 31, 45, 66, 81, 97, 123, 148, 182
 182 is a nontotient number, as there is no integer with exactly 182 coprimes below it
 182 is an odious number
 182 is a pronic number, oblong number or heteromecic number, a number which is the product of two consecutive integers (13 × 14)
 182 is a repdigit in the D'ni numeral system (77), and in base 9 (222)
 182 is a sphenic number, the product of three prime factors
 182 is a square-free number
 182 is an Ulam number
 Divisors of 182: 1, 2, 7, 13, 14, 26, 91, 182

In astronomy
 182 Elsa is a S-type main belt asteroid
 OGLE-TR-182 is a star in the constellation Carina

In the military

 JDS Ise (DDH-182), a Hyūga-class helicopter destroyer of the Japan Maritime Self-Defense Force
 The United States Air Force 182d Airlift Wing unit at Greater Peoria Regional Airport, Peoria, Illinois
  was a United States Navy troop transport during World War II
  was a United States Navy yacht during World War I
  was a United States Navy Alamosa-class cargo ship during World War II
  was a United States Navy  during World War II
  was a United States Navy  during World War II
  was a United States Navy  following World War I
 182nd Fighter Squadron, Texas Air National Guard unit of the Texas Air National Guard
 182nd Infantry Regiment, now known as the 182nd Cavalry Squadron (RSTA), is the oldest combat regiment in the United States Army
 182nd Battalion, Canadian Expeditionary Force during World War I

In music
 Blink-182, an American pop punk band
 Blink-182 (album), their 2003 eponymous album

In transportation
 Alfa Romeo 182 Formula One car
 182nd–183rd Streets station on the IND Concourse Line of the New York City Subway
 London Buses route 182
 Bücker Bü 182 was a single-seat advanced trainer plane in Germany
 Cessna 182 marketed under the name Skylane, is a four-seat, single-engine, light airplane
 Flight 182
 Pacific Southwest Airlines Flight 182 collided with a Cessna skyhawk in San Diego on September 25, 1978
 Air India Flight 182, exploded by a terrorist bombing off the coast of Ireland on June 23, 1985
 DDG-182 Mirai, a fictional ship in the anime Zipang

In other fields
182 is also:
 The year AD 182 or 182 BC
 The atomic number of an element temporarily called Unoctbium
 The Laird o Logie is child ballad #182
 The human gene GPR182 (or G protein-coupled receptor 182)
 The Star of Bombay is a  cabochon-cut star sapphire originating from Sri Lanka
 The band Blink 182 used the number randomly to distinguish themselves from another band named Blink

See also
 List of highways numbered 182
 United Nations Security Council Resolution 182
 United States Supreme Court cases, Volume 182

External links

 Number Facts and Trivia: 182
 The Number 182
 The Positive Integer 182
 Number Gossip: 182

References 

Integers